Nguyễn Hồng Việt (born 30 June 1989) is a Vietnamese footballer who plays as a midfielder for V.League 2 club An Giang.

References

1989 births
Living people
Vietnamese footballers
Association football midfielders
Song Lam Nghe An FC players
Dong Nai FC players
Haiphong FC players
V.League 1 players
People from Nghệ An province